The 2022–23 Czech Cup, known as the MOL Cup for sponsorship reasons, is the 30th season of the annual knockout football tournament of the Czech Republic. It began with the preliminary round on 22 July 2022.

Extra preliminary round 

|colspan="3" style="background-color:#D0D0D0" align=center|22 July 2022

|-
|colspan="3" style="background-color:#D0D0D0" align=center|23 July 2022

Preliminary round 

|colspan="3" style="background-color:#D0D0D0" align=center|29 July 2022

|-
|colspan="3" style="background-color:#D0D0D0" align=center|30 July 2022

}

|-
|colspan="3" style="background-color:#D0D0D0" align=center|31 July 2022

|-
|colspan="3" style="background-color:#D0D0D0" align=center|2 August 2022

|-
|colspan="3" style="background-color:#D0D0D0" align=center|3 August 2022

First round 

|colspan="3" style="background-color:#D0D0D0" align=center|10 August 2022

|-
|colspan="3" style="background-color:#D0D0D0" align=center|16 August 2022

|-
|colspan="3" style="background-color:#D0D0D0" align=center|17 August 2022

|-
|colspan="3" style="background-color:#D0D0D0" align=center|23 August 2022

|-
|colspan="3" style="background-color:#D0D0D0" align=center|24 August 2022

Second round 
The draw took place on 26 August 2022.

|colspan="3" style="background-color:#D0D0D0" align=center|13 September 2022

|-
|colspan="3" style="background-color:#D0D0D0" align=center|14 September 2022

|-
|colspan="3" style="background-color:#D0D0D0" align=center|20 September 2022

|-
|colspan="3" style="background-color:#D0D0D0" align=center|21 September 2022

Third round 
The draw took place on 23 September 2022.

|colspan="3" style="background-color:#D0D0D0" align=center|11 October 2022

|-
|colspan="3" style="background-color:#D0D0D0" align=center|18 October 2022

|-
|colspan="3" style="background-color:#D0D0D0" align=center|19 October 2022

|-
|colspan="3" style="background-color:#D0D0D0" align=center|25 October 2022

Fourth round 
The draw took place on 31 October 2022.

|colspan="3" style="background-color:#D0D0D0" align=center|17 November 2022

|-
|colspan="3" style="background-color:#D0D0D0" align=center|18 November 2022

|-
|colspan="3" style="background-color:#D0D0D0" align=center|19 November 2022

|-
|colspan="3" style="background-color:#D0D0D0" align=center|26 November 2022

|-
|colspan="3" style="background-color:#D0D0D0" align=center|1 February 2023

Quarter-finals 

|colspan="3" style="background-color:#D0D0D0" align=center|1 March 2023

References

External links 
Season on soccerway.com
MOL Cup

Czech Cup seasons
Cup
Czech